Ptychobela lanceolata is a species of sea snail, a marine gastropod mollusc in the family Pseudomelatomidae, the turrids and allies.

Description
The length of the shell attains 17 mm.

Distribution
This species occurs off Papua New Guinea and Solomon Islands

References

External links
 

lanceolata
Gastropods described in 1845